Zophopetes cerymica, the common palm nightfighter, is a butterfly in the family Hesperiidae. It is found in Senegal, Gambia, Guinea-Bissau, Guinea, Sierra Leone, Liberia, Ivory Coast, Ghana, Togo, Benin, Nigeria, Cameroon, Angola, the eastern part of the Democratic Republic of the Congo and north-western Zambia. It is found in various habitats, as long as palms are present.

Adults have been recorded feeding from red flowers of a root parasite.

The larvae feed on Elaeis guineensis, Cocos nucifera, Raphia, Borassus and Phoenix species.

References

Butterflies described in 1867
Erionotini
Butterflies of Africa
Taxa named by William Chapman Hewitson